The Federal Research Division (FRD) is the research and analysis unit of the United States Library of Congress.

The Federal Research Division provides directed research and analysis on domestic and international subjects to agencies of the United States government, the District of Columbia, and authorized federal contractors. As expert users of the vast English and foreign-language collections of the Library of Congress, the Division's area and subject specialists employ the resources of the world's largest library and other information sources worldwide to produce impartial and comprehensive studies on a cost-recovery basis.

The Federal Research Program is run by the Federal Research Division (FRD), the fee-for-service research and analysis unit within the Library of Congress. The Federal Research Program of the Library of Congress was authorized by the United States Congress in accordance with the Library of Congress Fiscal Operations Improvement Act of 2000 (2 U.S.C. 182c). FRD has provided custom products and services on a cost-recovery basis to entities of the Federal government of the United States since 1948. It also is authorized to provide the same services to governmental entities of Washington, D.C. Through the Federal Acquisition Regulations (FAR 51.1), FRD provides services to authorized Federal contractors and through a comprehensive services agreement with the U.S. National Technical Information Service External Link, FRD can provide custom research services to the private sector, state and local government, international organizations, and others.

Address
The Federal Research Division (FRD) is located on the fifth floor of the John Adams Building in Washington, D.C.

Products
Primary research material including document delivery
Foreign-language abstracting and translation
Annotated bibliographies
Organizational and legislative histories
Studies and reports
Books, such as the Country Studies series

Services
Research and analysis
Writing and editing
Publishing

See also
Congressional Research Service

External links

 
 FRD Brochure

Library of Congress